In enzymology, a 6-hydroxyhexanoate dehydrogenase is an enzyme that catalyzes the chemical reaction

6-hydroxyhexanoate + NAD+  6-oxohexanoate + NADH + H+

Thus, the two substrates of this enzyme are 6-hydroxyhexanoate and NAD+, whereas its 3 products are 6-oxohexanoate, NADH, and H+.

This enzyme belongs to the family of oxidoreductases, specifically those acting on the CH-OH group of donor with NAD+ or NADP+ as acceptor. The systematic name of this enzyme class is 6-hydroxyhexanoate:NAD+ oxidoreductase. This enzyme participates in caprolactam degradation.

References

 
 

EC 1.1.1
NADH-dependent enzymes
Enzymes of unknown structure